Carolina Andrea Sepúlveda Sepúlveda (born 6 June 1980) is a Chilean chemical engineer who was elected as a member of the Chilean Constitutional Convention.

References

External links
 BCN Profile

Living people
1980 births
Chilean chemical engineers
21st-century Chilean politicians
Non-Neutral Independents politicians
University of Concepción alumni
Members of the Chilean Constitutional Convention